John Pratt  was a  Welsh Anglican priest in the second half of the  16th century.

Pratt was educated at Brasenose College, Oxford. He was  Archdeacon of St Davids from 1557 to 1581.

References

Alumni of Brasenose College, Oxford
Archdeacons of St Davids
16th-century Welsh Anglican priests